Hira Lal Devpura (1925–2004) was Chief Minister of Rajasthan state in India from 23 February 1985 to 10 March 1985. It was a stop gap arrangement between Shiv Charan Mathur and Hari Dev Joshi. He was a leader of Indian National Congress party. He represented the Kumbhalgarh Assembly constituency of Udaipur Division.
Abtak ke mukhyamantriyon me sabse nyuntam karyakaal inchi ka raha hai

Positions held

External links
 Photograph

Chief Ministers of Rajasthan
Speakers of the Rajasthan Legislative Assembly
Rajasthani people
1925 births
2004 deaths
Chief ministers from Indian National Congress
Indian National Congress politicians from Rajasthan